

L04A Immunosuppressants

L04AA Selective immunosuppressants
L04AA02 Muromonab-CD3
L04AA03 Antilymphocyte immunoglobulin (horse)
L04AA04 Antithymocyte immunoglobulin (rabbit)
L04AA06 Mycophenolic acid
L04AA10 Sirolimus
L04AA13 Leflunomide
L04AA15 Alefacept
L04AA18 Everolimus
L04AA19 Gusperimus
L04AA21 Efalizumab
L04AA22 Abetimus
L04AA23 Natalizumab
L04AA24 Abatacept
L04AA25 Eculizumab
L04AA26 Belimumab
L04AA27 Fingolimod
L04AA28 Belatacept
L04AA29 Tofacitinib
L04AA31 Teriflunomide
L04AA32 Apremilast
L04AA33 Vedolizumab
L04AA34 Alemtuzumab
L04AA35 Begelomab
L04AA36 Ocrelizumab
L04AA37 Baricitinib
L04AA38 Ozanimod
L04AA39 Emapalumab
L04AA40 Cladribine
L04AA41 Imlifidase
L04AA42 Siponimod
L04AA43 Ravulizumab
L04AA44 Upadacitinib
L04AA45 Filgotinib
L04AA46 Itacitinib
L04AA47 Inebilizumab
L04AA48 Belumosudil
L04AA49 Peficitinib
L04AA50 Ponesimod
L04AA51 Anifrolumab
L04AA52 Ofatumumab
L04AA53 Teprotumumab
L04AA54 Pegcetacoplan
L04AA55 Sutimlimab
L04AA56 Deucravacitinib
L04AA57 Ublituximab
L04AA58 Efgartigimod alfa
L04AA59 Avacopan

L04AB Tumor necrosis factor alpha (TNF-α) inhibitors 
L04AB01 Etanercept
L04AB02 Infliximab
L04AB03 Afelimomab
L04AB04 Adalimumab
L04AB05 Certolizumab pegol
L04AB06 Golimumab
L04AB07 Opinercept

L04AC Interleukin inhibitors
L04AC01 Daclizumab
L04AC02 Basiliximab
L04AC03 Anakinra
L04AC04 Rilonacept
L04AC05 Ustekinumab
L04AC07 Tocilizumab
L04AC08 Canakinumab
L04AC09 Briakinumab
L04AC10 Secukinumab
L04AC11 Siltuximab
L04AC12 Brodalumab
L04AC13 Ixekizumab
L04AC14 Sarilumab
L04AC15 Sirukumab
L04AC16 Guselkumab
L04AC17 Tildrakizumab
L04AC18 Risankizumab
L04AC19 Satralizumab
L04AC20 Netakimab
L04AC21 Bimekizumab
L04AC22 Spesolimab
L04AC23 Olokizumab

L04AD Calcineurin inhibitors
L04AD01 Ciclosporin
L04AD02 Tacrolimus
L04AD03 Voclosporin

L04AX Other immunosuppressants
L04AX01 Azathioprine
L04AX02 Thalidomide
L04AX03 Methotrexate
L04AX04 Lenalidomide
L04AX05 Pirfenidone
L04AX06 Pomalidomide
L04AX07 Dimethyl fumarate
L04AX08 Darvadstrocel
L04AX09 Diroximel fumarate

References

L04